Home to Win is a Canadian home renovation reality television series, which premiered April 24, 2016 on HGTV Canada. The series features contractors and designers from all of the network's original productions collaborating on the renovation and design of a single "dream house", which will be awarded to a registered viewer at the end of the series. The series is also dubbed into the French language, and aired on the Canadian channel CASA as Maison à Gagner.

History
Season 1 features 20 of the network's personalities. It was hosted by Sangita Patel, the participating designers and contractors are Bryan Baeumler, Sarah Baeumler, Mike Holmes, Mike Holmes Jr., Scott McGillivray, Sarah Richardson, Paul Lafrance, Sebastian Clovis, Danielle Bryk, Tommy Smythe, Samantha Pynn, Tiffany Pratt, Carson Arthur, Jo Alcorn, Mia Parres, Rob Evans, Joey Fletcher, David Kenney, Kate Campbell and Colin Hunter. Each episode of the series concentrates primarily on one or two of the personalities working on the design of one particular room or outdoor space within the house, with different combinations of people taking on different rooms.

The original 20 designers and contractors returned in Season 2.  Newly participating designers and contractors included Brian McCourt, Sarah Keenleyside, Sabrina Smelko, and Carson Arthur. Guest stars included Dave and Kortney Wilson from Masters of Flip, and Drew Scott and Jonathan Scott from Property Brothers.

Episodes

Season 1

Season 2

Season 3

Season 4

See also
 Home Free (2015 TV series), USA's analogous TV series
 HGTV Dream Home, HGTV USA's home give-a-way

References

External links
  Official site: https://www.hometowin.ca/
  CASA: Maison à Gagner (official site)

2016 Canadian television series debuts
2010s Canadian reality television series
Home renovation television series
English-language television shows